= Ergobrotis =

Town of ancient Galatia

Coordinates: 40°08′02″N 32°09′00″E

Ergobrotis was a town of ancient Galatia, inhabited during Byzantine times. Its name does not occur among ancient authors, but is inferred from epigraphic and other evidence.

Its site is located near Tiske, Asiatic Turkey.
